Zoodochos Pigi (Ζωοδόχος Πηγή), Greek for Life-giving Spring, may refer to:

Places
 a village in the town Didymoteicho, Evros, Greece
 Zoodochos Pigi, Larissa, a settlement in the Larissa regional unit
 , a village on the island of Naxos
 an islet in the Alkyonides Gulf

Churches 
 Church of St. Mary of the Spring (Istanbul)
 Zoodochos Pigi Church, Dervenosalesi, Greece
 
 Zoodochos Pigi Monastery, Poros, Greece

Modern Greek words and phrases
New Testament Greek words and phrases